Atalanta B.C. was promoted to Serie A, despite finishing only 5th in Serie B. The reason for the promotion was the expansion of the top domestic division from 18 to 20 teams. That offered a reprieve to an underperforming Atalanta side that failed to keep up with Palermo following Christmas.

Squad

Goalkeepers
  Massimo Taibi
  Alex Calderoni

Defenders
  Gianpaolo Bellini
  Natale Gonnella
  Duccio Innocenti
  Stefano Lorenzi
  Fabio Rustico
  Santos
  Mohamed Sarr
  Vlado Šmit

Midfielders
  Antonio Bernardini
  Andrea Lazzari
  Michele Marcolini
  Nicola Mingazzini
  Riccardo Montolivo
  Biagio Pagano
  Alex Pinardi
  Damiano Zenoni

Attackers
  Rolando Bianchi
  Igor Budan
  Gianni Comandini
  Carmine Gautieri
  Luigi Della Rocca
  Giampaolo Pazzini
  Luca Saudati
  Davor Vugrinec

Serie B

League table

Atalanta B.C. seasons
Atalanta